"Do Ya" is a song written by Jeff Lynne, that was originally recorded by The Move, which became a hit for the Electric Light Orchestra (led by Lynne, ELO originally being a side project of The Move) in 1977.

Release
Written by Jeff Lynne in 1971, it was one of two songs featured on the B-side of the UK hit "California Man" credited to The Move (the other was Roy Wood's "Ella James"). In the US the B-side proved to be more popular than the A and so the song became The Move's only hit in the US albeit a minor one (number 93 on the Hot 100 chart). The song was originally titled "Look Out Baby, There's a Plane A Comin'" (which is sung by Wood at the end of the song). The song was later included on the 2005 remastered version of the Message from the Country album, in both the original single version and an alternate take.
 
The song was recorded on the same multireel tapes alongside the Electric Light Orchestra (ELO) tracks "From the Sun to the World" and "In Old England Town", the two songs that Wood appeared on from the ELO 2 album.

Chart position

Electric Light Orchestra version

Electric Light Orchestra (ELO) began to perform "Do Ya" live with Lynne on lead vocals from 1973 to 1975, and also integrated its riff into live versions of 10538 Overture as seen on their 1974 album The Night the Light Went On in Long Beach. They recorded it in the studio for inclusion on the 1976 album A New World Record. In a 1978 interview for Australian radio stations 2SM and 3XY, Bev Bevan stated the reason for the re-recording was that, after ELO had added the song to their live performances, a music journalist asked the band their opinion of "the original version" by Todd Rundgren. (Utopia, a band Rundgren started in 1974, had been performing "Do Ya" in concert, and included a live recording on the 1975 Another Live.) Bevan said they decided to re-record it as ELO in order to "let everyone know that it's a Jeff Lynne song."

According to Billboard it has "an irresistibly catchy melody line and syncopated beat."  Cash Box wrote that it was "a smash for the Move and that this arrangement treats the classic with all the respect it demands." Record World said that ELO " embellish[ed] the song with a lavish production."

Ultimate Classic Rock critic Michael Gallucci rated it ELO's seventh best song, writing that it features one of rock's all-time greatest guitar riffs."

In 2000, Lynne found an unedited alternative mix for the song, also recorded in 1976, that he decided he preferred over the album cut. A digital remaster of the track is included on the compilation box set Flashback.

Chart performance

Weekly charts

Year-end charts

Jeff Lynne version

Jeff Lynne re-recorded the song in his own home studio. It was released in a compilation album with other re-recorded ELO songs under the ELO name.

Other versions
The song has been covered by Ace Frehley of KISS on his 1989 solo album Trouble Walkin' and Todd Rundgren with his band Utopia on his 1975 album Another Live and 1998 Japanese-imported album Somewhere/Anywhere, a collection of unreleased tracks, in which the title is a pun on his 1972 release Something/Anything. Rundgren also performed it with Utopia on the live 2019 DVD/CD release recorded at Chicago Theatre in 2018.

References

External links
In-depth Song Analysis at the Jeff Lynne Song Database (jefflynnesongs.com)

1971 songs
1977 singles
The Move songs
Electric Light Orchestra songs
Glam rock songs
Song recordings produced by Jeff Lynne
Song recordings produced by Roy Wood
Songs written by Jeff Lynne
United Artists Records singles
Harvest Records singles
Jet Records singles